is a 1988 Japanese comedy film directed by Yoji Yamada. It stars Kiyoshi Atsumi as Torajirō Kuruma (Tora-san), and Yoshiko Mita as his love interest or "Madonna". Tora-san's Salad-Day Memorial is the fortieth entry in the popular, long-running Otoko wa Tsurai yo series. The title comes from Machi Tawara poetry collection Salad Anniversary, on which this movie was based.

Synopsis
In his travels through Japan, Tora-san meets and falls in love with a female doctor, but he is afraid of committing to a relationship.

Cast
 Kiyoshi Atsumi as Torajirō
 Chieko Baisho as Sakura
 Yoshiko Mita as Machiko
 Hiroko Mita as Yuki
 Shimojo Masami as Kuruma Tatsuzō
 Chieko Misaki as Tsune Kuruma (Torajiro's aunt)
 Gin Maeda as Hiroshi Suwa
 Hidetaka Yoshioka as Mitsuo Suwa
 Hisao Dazai as Boss (Umetarō Katsura)
 Gajirō Satō as Genkō
 Toshinori Omi as Sei
 Chishū Ryū as Gozen-sama
 Tomoko Naraoka as Machiko's mother

Critical appraisal
Yoshiko Mita was nominated for Best Actress at the Japan Academy Prize for her role in Tora-san's Salad-Day Memorial. Kevin Thomas at the Los Angeles Times gave the film a positive review.  The German-language site molodezhnaja gives Tora-san's Salad-Day Memorial four out of five stars, labeling it one of the highlights of the series.

Availability
Tora-san's Salad-Day Memorial was released theatrically on December 24, 1988. In Japan, the film has been released on videotape in 1989 and 1996, and in DVD format in 2005 and 2008.

References

Bibliography

English

German

Japanese

External links
 Tora-san's Salad-Day Memorial at www.tora-san.jp (official site)

1988 films
Films directed by Yoji Yamada
1988 comedy films
1980s Japanese-language films
Otoko wa Tsurai yo films
Japanese sequel films
Shochiku films
Films with screenplays by Yôji Yamada
1980s Japanese films